The geology of Åland  includes Jotnian age sediments from the Proterozoic, such as sandstone, siltstone, arkose, conglomerate and shale. The islands are underlain by plutonic rocks common of the Svecofennian Domain.

References

 
Aland